The Dyirbal, also called Jirrbal, are an Aboriginal Australian people living in northern Queensland, both one tribe (the Dyirbalŋan or 'Tully River blacks') and a group of related contiguous peoples included under that label as the Dyirbal tribes. They lived on the upper Murray river of the Atherton Tableland. Their name is used as a generic term to refer specifically to one of eight groups, the others being Yidinji, Ngadyan, Mamu, Girramay, Wargamay, Waruŋu and Mbabaɽam.

Language
Dyirbal belongs to the Dyirbalic branch of the Pama–Nyungan language family. It is one of several dialects, for Giramay, Mamu, Dyiru, Gulŋay, and Ngajan. It is an ergative language allowing words in the sentence in any order. It has four genders, classifying things as 'masculine' (bayi), 'feminine'(balan), 'edible'(non-flesh foods) (balam) or 'neuter' (bala). In addition to this, a dozen different markers could be added to any noun, indicating the precise location, distance or direction of what is being referred to. It also used to have a special mother-in-law language, called Dyalŋuy (Jalnguy), switching to it from everyday language (guwal) whenever one's mother-in-law was present, or, in the case of a woman, one's father-in-law.

Country
They lived in the tropical rainforest much of which, apart from the coastal areas, was then cleared in order to facilitate banana plantations. Norman Tindale calculated that their tribal territory encompassed some 1,100 sq. milesd, taking in the areas of Herberton southwards as far the headwaters of the Herbert River north of Cashmere. Their eastern boundary lay around Tully Falls. Ravenshoe, Millaa Millaa, and Woodleigh were also developed on Dyirbal land.

A myth still current appears to explain the difference between the highland flora and that of the coastal zone: The tall upcountry forest members, trees like bull oak,
water gum and black walnut had the idea of advancing eastwards to set down roots along the coast, but their endeavour was obstructed by the mangroves, which fashioned boomerangs from their roots and fought the arboreal invaders off so that the lowlands are clear of such species. In 1996 a large part of Girramay country, including sacred sites, was bulldozed, dynamited and fenced in by King Ranch, the American pastoral company, after it obtained a lease from the Queensland Government, paying $2 per acre for forest, and $5 per acre for scrubland. Sacred sites like Yungigali, which in a Dreamtime legend was where a dog was transmogrified into a rock, were devastated.

Society
The Dyirbal consisted of several hordes, such as the Njirma, who were located at Ravenshoe.

Each of the clans composing the Dyirbal had four sections, with a corresponding totem:

The marriage rules regarding the four sections were as follows:

  men had to marry  women.
  men had to marry  women.
  men had to marry .
  men had to marry .

History
The first contact with whites goes back to 1848, at which time it has been estimated that each dialect group in the generic Djirbal tribal societies had around 500 members. Dixon estimates the total numbers at 5,000, which, within five decades of white settlement, indiscriminate shootings and disease, had the impact of leading to their decimation to something like 10% of their original strength by the end of the 19th century. They, with the related Girramaygans, eventually gathered together south of Tully in the Upper Murray, tolerated by settlers, one of whom is reported to have said in the 1920s that: 'There are no bad Aborigines left here: they've all been shot'. One pioneer was nicknamed scrub-itch because he adopted the habit of shooting at aborigines if he came across them dancing at their initiations corroborees. One Aboriginal woman who kept house with 'Scrub-itch' was ordered one day to fetch eggs from a scrub hen nest, and he then shot her dead as she dug into one of their breeding mounds. He had gotten bored by her attentions. It was a habit of whites among the Upper Murray tribes to take aboriginal concubines and, when they got pregnant, slaughter their own children.

Encounter with Captain Cook
Either Dyirbal collective memory, or the ingenuity of one of its last speakers, Chloe Grant, tells of an incident conserved from the Girramaygan tribe. Were it true it would means that they had conserved, for 200 years a clear memory of the day James Cook, sailing along the Cassowary Coast Region, set foot on the shore of the territory at what is now Cardwell, Queensland. The anecdote was collected by the specialist in Australian Aboriginal languages, Robert M. W. Dixon, from his informant Chloe Grant in 1963-4. Chloe Grant was born of an Irish father and a Girramaygan mother in 1903, and died in 1974. According to her account, Cook, whom the natives took to be a spirit because of his white skin, beached his boat (literally a log vessel or raft). The encounter consisted of four distinct moments: at first, Cook and members of his crew took out pipes, lit them, and offered tobacco to the tribe. The sight left them perplexed as they mulled the meaning of the burning object and smoke in the Europeans' mouths. Then Cook boiled a billy of tea and offered them a drink, which they rebuffed as just dirty water. At this point, Cook laid out a johnnycake on the coals of the fire he had lit, flipped it over and back till it was cooked, broke off pieces and offered to share eit with his hosts. The food thus prepared resembled their native walnut cakes (wila), but smelt stale and was likewise rejected. At this point, Cook them some boiled meat, beef, and, tasting it, they found it edible.

Finally Cook readied his boat for departure, and the tribe was disconcerted: for them, the encounter was one with their ancestors from the other-world, who might offer them counsel. They pleaded with him to stay over: 'Father, father, come here, come back to us, to no avail.

20th century
In the early 20th century, many families were forcibly removed from their country and placed in the Aboriginal reserve that also served as a penal colony on Great Palm Island.

Cannibalistic episode
The Dyirbal tribes did not engage in cannibalism in order just to eat people. It had a punitive retaliatory function, especially with regard to people judged to have violated native law. The last instance occurred in 1940, when Mick Bulbu (tribal name Burburra) was killed by Jumbulu for numerous violations of tribal law, and had part of his body cut up and eaten.

Songs
Dyirbal songs are divided into dancing and love songs. The dancing style was called gama. One recorded by Robert Dixon from Wille Kelly on the outskirts of Ravenshoe takes as its theme the willie wagtail (Dyirbal: , or in the mother-in-law register of the language,  "he who belongs to the fighting ground"). This bird, unlike most, is classified as male, since they are believed to be the ghosts of mythical men, and its method of fluttering its tail was likened to the dance, in shake-a-leg style (legs fixed in a position while the knees wobble) of an initiated man at a corroboree. It also conveyed the manner of a spirit moving in the otherworld. For the anthropologist, in its interweaving of native bird lore, customs and bush, it seemed, hauntingly, to embody the essence of North Queensland's traditional world. The first lines, repeated throughout the song, run:

.

Alternative names
 Chirpa
 Chirpalji
 Choolngai. (Wakara exonym)
 Djirbal
 Dyirbaldyi
 Dyirbalngan
 Njirma
 Tjirbal

Source:

Some words
If one's mother-in-law or a close relative of hers were present, one would substitute these terms with a different verb, .
 . A Tully River toponym. The literal meaning is, 'where a man bit the vaginal lips of a woman when he should not have.'
 . To crouch down on one's heels with knees off the ground.
 . A person huddled up, arms embracing the legs, with knees touching the chin: of old people, struggling to keep warm in cold weather.
  (Girramay). to keep removing elements of a group or pile, till almost none remain of that class, as the mythical form of the cassowary did in wringing the necks of children it found, till nearly none were left.

In film
Fabio Cavadini and his brother Alessandro Cavadini made a short film called We Stop Here (released 1977) about the Dyirbal people, in particular the removal of some of the people to the penal colony on Palm Island, Queensland.

Notes

Citations

Sources

Aboriginal peoples of Queensland
Far North Queensland